The Buero Vallejo Awards (Spanish: Premios Buero Vallejo), Buero-Vallejo Awards or Buero Theater Awards are awards granted annually to theater professionals in Spain, with the aim of rewarding and recognizing the quality of the most outstanding young theater productions.

The awards were created in 2003 and their name is in honor of the Spanish playwright Antonio Buero Vallejo. The purpose of these awards is to reward young theatrical productions staged by (high) school theater groups, non-school theater groups (associations, theater workshops...), or university theater groups or unofficial university theater groups (colleges, universities, drama schools...).

History 
The Buero Vallejo Awards were created in 2003 by the "Juan Manuel Sáinz de Vicuña" Coca-Cola Foundation and the Ministry of Culture of the Government of Spain. Currently, the National Institute of Performing Arts and Music (INAEM) also participates.

The aim of the awards is to recognize and reward the quality of young theater productions staged by (high) school theater groups, non-school theater groups (associations, theater workshops...) or university theater groups or unofficial university theater groups (colleges, universities, drama schools...) made up of young actors and actresses among 14 and 21 years old.

The Buero Vallejo awards are granted at the regional level, in which the regional juries choose the winning productions from each region, and at the national level, in which a national jury designates the four best productions, which represent their works, within the Youth Theater Week in Madrid, in main and well-known theaters in the Spanish capital such as the Teatro La Latina, Teatro Valle-Inclán...The Buero Vallejo Awards are considered a "pool of young talents". Until the year 2022, 98,000 young actors and actresses have participated in the Buero Awards and 4,990 theatrical productions and productions have been candidates for the awards since the birth of the awards in 2003.

Well-known actors and actresses have been awarded the Buero Vallejo Award. Among them: Chechu Salgado, Natalia Huarte, Nacho Sánchez, Aída Flix, Jaime Riba, Carmen Climent, Nerea Elizalde, Ana Peinado, Fabio Arrante, ...

At the regional level of the Buero Vallejo Awards, the categories of best show or theatrical production and best actor and best actress are awarded. At the national level, only the category of best show or theatrical production is awarded.

In 2020, due to the COVID-19 pandemic, the regional and national awards galas were broadcast online, in a very special gala that included the participation of actor Antonio Banderas, who defined the participants as the "future of Spanish theatre". Sergio Peris-Mencheta, Manuel Galiana, Antonio Resines, María Adánez, Carlos Hipólito, Juan Echanove, Cayetana Guillén-Cuervo and Emilio Gutiérrez-Caba also participated.

In 2013, the award ceremony was attended by the Queen Leticia of Spain.

References 

Spanish awards
Spanish theatre awards
Awards established in 2003